Hellfjord is a Norwegian TV series. It consists of seven 30 minute episodes and premiered on NRK1 9 October 2012. The series was produced by Tommy Wirkola of Tappeluft Pictures for NRK.

Premise
Salmander is a police officer from Oslo who, after mistakenly killing his police horse in front of a large group of children, is banished to the Northern Norwegian village of Hellfjord. In beautiful but mysterious Hellfjord he is welcomed by the vulgar and eccentric sheriff, and meets the dim-witted journalist Johanne who suspects that something lies beneath the surface in the village. Salmander has to contend with murders and the local sea monster.

Cast
 Zahid Ali – Salmander
 Stig Frode Henriksen – Kobba
 Ingrid Bolsø Berdal – Johanne
 Thomas Hanzon – Bosse Nova
 Pihla Viitala – Riina
 Lars Arentz-Hansen – Brobaker

Production
The series is written and produced by Tommy Sten, Zahid Ali and Stig Frode Henriksen and was recorded in Gryllefjord on the island of Senja, and Film Camp in Øverbygd summer 2011. The series was sold abroad even before it was recorded.

International broadcast 
 — The series premiered on SBS One from 18 November 2013.
Latin America - The series is available for free on Crackle since July, 2015.
 - The series premiered on TTV from 28 May 2016.
 - The series premiered on Channel 4 on 7 July 2017.

References

External links
 
 Hellfjord on Facebook
 Hellfjord on Crackle
 Hellfjord at Filmweb
 Hellfjord on ВКонтакте / VK.com

2012 Norwegian television series debuts
Norwegian drama television series
NRK original programming
2010s Norwegian television series